Save America's Treasures is a United States federal government initiative to preserve and protect historic buildings, arts, and published works.  It is a public–private partnership between the U.S. National Park Service and the National Trust for Historic Preservation.  The National Endowment for the Arts, National Endowment for the Humanities, and Institute of Museum and Library Services are also partners in the work. In the early years of the program, Heritage Preservation and the National Park Foundation were also involved.

History
Save America's Treasures (SAT) was established by Executive Order 13072 in February 1998 by President Bill Clinton, in conjunction with the White House Millennium Council's activities.  Instrumental in its founding was then First Lady of the United States Hillary Rodham Clinton. Its Honorary Chair is traditionally the First Lady as designated by the President's Committee on the Arts and Humanities "Selection criteria require that each project be of national significance, demonstrate an urgent preservation need, have an educational or otherwise clear public benefit, and demonstrate the likely availability of non-federal matching funds. Each grant requires non-federal matching funds, which has stimulated contributions from states, localities, corporations, foundations and individuals who value our shared heritage."

On December 9, 2009, First Lady Michelle Obama said “Save America’s Treasures invests in our nation’s irreplaceable legacy of buildings, documents, collections and artistic works. These awards empower communities all over the country to rescue and restore this priceless heritage, and ensure that future generations continue to learn from the voices, ideas, events and people represented by these projects.”  Despite this initial endorsement, both the Save America's Treasures and the Preserve America grant programs were later eliminated by the Obama Administration. On January 30, 2010, President Barack Obama in his "Tough Choices" FY 2011 Budget proposed eliminating the Save America's Treasures and Preserve America grant programs, stating that "both programs lack rigorous performance metrics and evaluation efforts so the benefits are unclear." The National Trust for Historic Preservation eliminated its Save America's Treasures office in 2011 during a reorganization.

From 1999 - 2010, over $318 million were awarded and matched by over $400 million from other sources, resulting in the preservation of over 1200 significant historic structures and repositories of cultural heritage. As of 2012, the program had been responsible for the creation of about 16,000 jobs.  This corresponds to a cost of about $13,000 to create each job. In 2010, according to the American Architectural Foundation, there were 175 ongoing SAT projects.

Funding ceased after 2010 because of concerns about adequate "performance metrics and evaluation efforts” yet resumed in 2017.

Monies for the program come from the Historic Preservation Fund (HPF), a source of revenue from federal oil leases that does not expend taxpayer dollars.

List of Official Projects and Awardees Chronologically and By Honorary Chairman

Hillary Clinton, Honorary Chair

1999 ($13 million awarded, 22 projects)

 Fort Egbert, Eagle, AK
 Recreation Hall, Kennecott Mine, Wrangell, St. Elias National Park and Preserve, Cooper Center, AK
 Sloss Furnaces, Birmingham, AL
 Manzanar National Historic Site, Independence, CA
 Pelican Island National Wildlife Refuge, Sebastian, FL 
 Ebenezer Baptist Church, Martin Luther King, Jr. National Historic Site, Atlanta, GA
 Experimental Breeder Reactor 1, Idaho National Engineering and Environmental Laboratory, Scoville, ID
 Chesterwood, Stockbridge, MA 
 The Mount, Lenox, MA ($2,865,000)
 Washburn "A" Mill, Minneapolis, MN
 Fourth Ward School, Virginia City, NE
 Buildings of the Manhattan Project, Los Alamos, NM
 Louis Armstrong House and Archives, Queens College, New York, NY
 The 1905 Wright Flyer III, Dayton, OH
 Paul Laurence Dunbar House and Barn, Dayton Aviation Heritage National Historical Park, Dayton, OH
 Fallingwater, Bear Run, PA 
 The Letter Box, Grey Towers, Milford, PA 
 Peter Wolf Administration Building, Fair Park, Dallas, TX
 Jackson Ward Historic District, Richmond, VA 
 Taliesin, Spring Green, WI 
 Sewall-Belmont House, Washington, D.C.
 Commercial Pacific Cable Buildings and Former Naval Facilities, Midway National Wildlife Refuge

2000 ($30 million awarded)

 Sitka Pioneer Home, Sitka, AK ($150,000)
 Unalaska Aerology Building, Unalaska, AK ($100,000)
 Saturn V Rocket, G.C. Marshall Space Flight Center, Huntsville, AL ($700,000)
 Tannehill/Brierfield Ironworks, McCalla, AL ($250,000)
 Central High School National Historic Site, Little Rock, AR ($500,000)
 "Saving Southwest Traditions: The Pottery Project," Arizona State Museum, Tucson, AZ ($400,000)
 Angel Island Immigration Station, Tiburon, CA ($500,000)
 Knight Foundry Water-Powered Iron Works, Sutter Creek Award amount: ($250,000)
 Old First National Bank, Telluride, CO ($250,000)
 The Charter Murals, National Archives Building, Washington, D.C. ($500,000)
 Dance Heritage Coalition ($90,000)
Katherine Dunham Archives, East St. Louis, IL
Hulla Huhm Dance Collection, Honolulu, HI
Gertrude Kurath, Eleanor King, and Kealiinohomoku Collections, Flagstaff, AZ
 Historic Sound Recording Collections of the American People, Smithsonian Institution, Washington, D. C. ($750,000)
 Anderson Cottage, United States Soldiers' and Airmen's Home, Washington, D.C. ($750,000)
 , Honolulu, HI ($300,000)
 Woodbury County Courthouse, Sioux City, IA ($300,000)
 Cahokia Mounds Archaeological Collection, Illinois State Museum, Springfield, IL ($55,000)
 Edward E. Ayer American Indian History Collection, The Newberry Library, Chicago, IL ($125,000)
 John J. Glessner House, Chicago, IL ($250,000)
 Frederick C. Robie House, Chicago, IL ($250,000)
 Indiana Cotton Mill, Cannelton, IN ($250,000)
 Chase County Courthouse, Cottonwood Falls, KS ($250,000)
 Africa House, Yucca House and Prudhomme-Roquier House collectively known as Melrose Plantation, Natchitoches, LA ($250,000)
 Sotterley Plantation, Hollywood, MD ($400,000)
 Colonial Theatre, Pittsfield, MA ($400,000)
 Orchard House, Concord, MA ($400,000)
 American Antiquarian Society Library, Worcester, MA ($400,000)
 Cranbrook House, Bloomfield Hills, MI ($300,000)
 St. Louis Civil Court Records, St. Louis, MO ($175,000)
 Grand Opera House of Mississippi, Meridian, MS ($400,000)
 Butte - Silver Bow Public Archives, Butte, MT ($50,000)
 Union Tavern / Thomas Day House, Milton, NC ($250,000)
 Stewart Indian Boarding School Historic District, Carson City, NE ($250,000)
 Canterbury Shaker Village, Canterbury, NH ($250,000)
 Laundry and Hospital Outbuilding at Ellis Island, Statue of Liberty National Monument, NJ ($500,000)
 Feather Cave Complex Collections Archaeological Collections, Albuquerque, NM ($75,000)
 Harriet Tubman National Historical Park, Auburn, NY ($450,000)
 The Tenement at 97 Orchard Street, New York, NY ($250,000)
 Records of the United States Sanitary Commission, New York, NY ($250,000)
 The Metropolitan Opera Radio and Television Archives, New York, NY ($200,000)
 Babe Ruth Scrapbooks, National Baseball Hall of Fame, Cooperstown, NY ($50,000)
 Western Fine Arts Collection, Oklahoma City, OK ($140,000)
 The Hermitage, near Nashville, TN ($340,000)
 Eastern State Penitentiary Historic Site, Philadelphia, PA ($500,000)
 1777-78 Continental Army Winter Encampment Structures, Valley Forge National Historical Park, PA ($450,000)
 Fort San Felipe del Morro, San Juan National Historic Site, San Juan, PR ($750,000)
 Southeast Lighthouse, Block Island, RI ($300,000)
 Drayton Hall, Charleston, SC ($250,000)
 Corn Palace, Mitchell, SD ($400,000)
 Promontory Cave Collection, Utah Museum of Natural History, Salt Lake City, UT ($50,000)
 B & O Railroad Roundhouse Complex, Martinsburg, WV ($500,000)
 Ten Chimneys, Genesee Depot, WI ($250,000)

2001 ($15 million awarded, 63 projects)

 Fort Mitchell Historic Site, AL ($300,000)
 Harrison Brothers Hardware, AL ($100,000)
 Pickens County Courthouse, AL ($100,000)
 , AL ($250,000)
 Alaska Moving Image Preservation Association, AK ($500,000)
 Camp Ouachita, AR ($365,000) 
 Florence Griswold Museum, Old Lyme, CT ($100,000)
 Hill-Stead Museum, CT ($115,000)
 Bishop Museum Moving Image Collection, HI ($50,000) 
 Englert Theatre, Iowa City, IA ($365,000) 
 Hegeler-Carus Mansion, IL ($200,000)
 Bailly Chapel House, IN ($200,000)
 Quindaro Archaeological Site Preservation, KS ($200,000) 
 Paducah-McCracken County River Heritage Museum, KY ($250,000)
 Shreveport Oakland Cemetery, LA ($365,000)  
 City Hall, Taunton, MA ($250,000)
 Mahaiwe Theater, MA ($250,000) 
 Documentation of the Immigrant Experience, MN ($250,000)
 University of Missouri (Audubon’s ‘‘Birds of America’’), MO ($155,000) 
 George Ohr Museum and Cultural Center, MS ($425,000)  
 Biltmore School, NC ($300,000) 
 Eagle Block Rehabilitation, NH ($250,000)
 Belknap Mill, NH ($250,000)
 1901 Pan Am Building, New York, NY ($100,000)
 Amer. Air Power Museum (hangar restoration & Tuskegee Airmen exhibits), NY ($200,000) 
 1838 Peter Augustus Jay House at the Jay Heritage Center Rye, NY ($100,000)
 Lion House at the Bronx Zoo, NY ($200,000)
 Scarsdale National Historic Railroad Station, NY ($100,000)
 State Theatre, NY ($150,000) 
 Franklin House, NY ($100,000) 
 Lincoln Historic Building, NM ($1,000,000)
 Akron Civic Theatre, OH ($500,000) 
 U.S. Air Force Museum (restoration of XC–99 aircraft), OH ($200,000)
 Harborview (Great Lakes Historical Society), OH ($100,000)
 Wooster City Schools Administrative Building, OH ($500,000)
 Akron Civic Theatre, OH ($500,000) 
 Lewis and Clark College (artifact preservation), OR ($400,000) 
 American Architectural Foundation, Washington, DC - Model of World Trade Center ($62,000)
 Academy of Music, Philadelphia Orchestra, PA ($200,000)
 Scranton Cultural Center, PA ($250,000)  
 Paul Robeson House, PA ($200,000)
 Masonic Temple, PA ($200,000)
 Pawtucket Armory, RI ($250,000) 
 Robert Mills Courthouse, Camden, SC ($330,000)
 University of South Dakota Old Women’s Gym/ Original Armory, SD ($365,000) 
 University of Vermont Morgan Horse Farm, VT ($365,000)
 Vermont Historical Society, Spaulding Grade School, Barre, VT ($365,000)
 Fort Nisqually, WA ($250,000)
 Lincoln Courthouse, WI ($280,000) 
 B&O Railroad/Vanadalia Corridor Restoration, WV ($200,000)
 Charles Washington Hall, WV ($200,000) 
 Frederick Douglass Junior and Senior High School, Huntington, WV ($270,000) 
 Arthurdale Historic Community (restoration), WV ($300,000) 
 West Virginia State Museum—Civil War Regimental Flag Collection, WV ($95,000)

2002 ($13.7 million awarded, 55 projects)
 Ferryboat Berkeley, San Diego, CA ($200,000)
 Grabhorn Institute for the Printing Arts, San Francisco, CA ($50,000)

Laura Bush, Honorary Chair

2003 ($14.4 million awarded)
 Massachusetts Historical Society, Boston, MA - Diaries of John Quincy Adams
 Kennedy Library, Boston, MA Ernest Hemingway's Papers
 St. Stephen's African Methodist Episcopal Church, Jefferson County, IN ($99,000)

2004
 Carl Sandburg Preservation Collection, University of Illinois Library, Urbana, Illinois ($239,000)

2005 ($14.5 million awarded)
 Rye Meeting House, Rye, NY ($50,000)
 Eleutherian College, Lancaster, IN ($200,000)

2006 ($7.6 million awarded, 42 projects)

 Sixteenth Street Baptist Church, Sixteenth Street Baptist Church, Birmingham, AL ($400,000)
 Archaeological, Botany, and Zoological Collections of the Colorado Plateau, Museum of Northern Arizona, Flagstaff, AZ ($250,000)
 Centennial Baptist Church, E. C. Morris Foundation, Helena-West-Helena, AR ($300,000)
 Alcatraz Island Gardens, Golden Gate National Parks Conservancy, San Francisco Bay, CA ($250,048)
 Hearst Metrotone Newsreel Collection, UCLA Film and Television Archive, Hollywood, CA ($200,000)
 Georgetown Schoolhouse, Georgetown Trust for Conservation and Preservation Inc., Georgetown, CO ($150,000)
 Clyfford Still Collection, Clyfford Still Museum, Denver, CO ($150,000)
 The Corcoran Gallery of Art, The Corcoran Gallery of Art, Washington, DC ($250,000)
 Farnsworth House, Landmarks Preservation Council of Illinois, Plano, IL ($137,630)
 The Three Arts Club, The Three Arts Club of Chicago, Chicago, IL ($100,000)
 Video Archives, The Joffrey Ballet, Chicago, IL ($75,000)
 Terrace Hill, Terrace Hill Foundation, Des Moines, IA ($150,000)
 Fort Jackson Artifacts, Plaquemines Parish Government, Buras, LA ($125,000)
 Skipjack Nellie L. Byrd, Chesapeake Bay Memories Charities, Inc., Middle River, MD ($94,000)
 Colonel James Barrett House, Save Our Heritage, Concord, MA ($220,000)
 United First Parish Church, United First Church (Unitarian), Quincy, MA ($100,000)
 Americana Collection, Norman B. Leventhal Map Center, Boston Public Library, Boston, MA ($135,000)
 Boston Common Collection, Boston Parks and Recreation Department, Boston, MA ($200,000)
 Fair Lane, The University of Michigan-Dearborn, Dearborn, MI ($350,000)
 Fort Snelling Upper Bluffs, Hennepin County, Hennepin, MN ($150,000)
 Working Office of Harry S Truman, The Harry S Truman Institute for National and International Affairs, Independence, MO ($125,000)
 Native American Collection, Nebraska State Historical Society, Lincoln, NE ($170,000)
 The Factory Building at Speedwell Village, Morris County Park Commission, Morristown, NJ ($325,000)
 Midmer-Losh Pipe Organ at Atlantic City Convention Hall, New Jersey Sports and Exposition Authority, Atlantic City, NJ ($100,000)
 Saint Augustine Church, Pueblo of Isleta, Isleta, NM ($150,000)
 101 Spring Street, Judd Foundation, New York, NY ($200,000)
 World Trade Center/September 11, 2001 Collection, New York State Museum, Albany, NY ($128,683)
 Van Rensselaer Manor Papers, New York State Library, Albany, NY ($58,000)
 Christ Church, Christ Church Preservation Trust, Philadelphia, PA ($350,000)
 The Pine Building, Pennsylvania Hospital, Philadelphia, PA ($350,000)
 “Battle of Gettysburg” Cyclorama Painting, Gettysburg Foundation, Gettysburg, PA ($200,000)
 Sol Feinstone Collection, The David Library of the American Revolution, Washington Crossing, PA  ($60,000)
 Tennessee Valley Authority Archaeological Collections, University of Tennessee, Knoxville, TN ($100,000)
 First National Bank Building, Galveston Arts Center, Inc., Galveston, TX ($250,000)
 Saint Luke’s Church, Historic St. Luke’s Restoration, Inc., Smithfield, VA ($250,000)
 Archaeological and Architectural Collections, Colonial Williamsburg Foundation, Williamsburg, VA ($200,000)
 Costume Collection, James Monroe Museum & Memorial Library, Fredericksburg, VA ($26,262)
 Collections, Orcas Island Historical Museum, Eastsound, WA ($100,000)
 American System-Built Home Model B-1, Frank Lloyd Wright Wisconsin Heritage Tourism Program, Milwaukee, WI ($150,000)
 Sheridan Inn, Sheridan Heritage Center, Inc., Sheridan, WY ($350,000)

2007 ($7.6 million awarded)
 Race Street Friends Meetinghouse,Philadelphia, PA

2008
 Pittsburgh Courier Historic Archives, Pittsburgh, PA ($148,000)

Michelle Obama, Honorary Chair

2009 ($9.5 million awarded)
 Kolmakovsky Redoubt Collection, Fairbanks, AK ($75,000)
 Episcopal Church of the Nativity, Huntsville, AL ($432,216)
 Hollyhock House, Los Angeles, CA ($489,000)
 Denver Museum of Nature & Science Anthropology Collection, Denver, CO ($324,385)
 Temple University - William Still Collection of Papers, Photographs, and Abolitionist Pamphlets
 Havre Historic Post Office and Courthouse, Gilford, Montana ($100,000)
 Stanford White Casino Theatre, Newport, RI ($400,000)
 Smithsonian, Washington, DC - National Anthropological Archives ($323,000) 
 Smithsonian Archives of American Art Oral History Collection, Washington, DC ($250,000)
 Old Naval Hospital Washington, D.C. ($150,000)
 Shelburne Museum, Shelburne, VT ($600,000)

2011 ( $14.3 million awarded).

 Norman Rockwell Museum Stockbridge, MA - Norman Rockwell’s Works on Paper, Illustrated Posters and Photographs($144,240)
 R. Buckminster Fuller and Anne Hewlett Dome Home Carbondale, IL ($125,000)
 Fort Mason San Francisco, CA ($700,000)
 Mission Santa Barbara Santa Barbara, CA ($650,000)
 SS Red Oak Victory, Richmond, CA ($700,000)
 Peabody Museum of Natural History - 19th-Century Dinosaur Collections of Othniel Charles Marsh
 Old State House, Little Rock, AR - Civil War Battle Flag Collection 
 Harvard University Peabody Museum, Cambridge, MA - Historic Alaska Native Kayaks and Related Collections
 Washington National Cathedral, Washington, DC ($700,000)
 National Museum of the American Indian, Washington, D.C. - Heye Foundation Collection ($29,905)
 Renwick Gallery, Washington, D.C. ($335,000)

2011 - 2016 (funding suspended)

2017 ($5 million awarded)

2018 ($13 million awarded)
 L A Dunton schooner at Mystic Seaport Museum, Mystic, CT ($491,750)
 Rosenfeld Collection of Maritime Photography, Mystic Seaport Museum, Mystic, CT ($244,417)

2019 ($13 million awarded)

See also

 Historical preservation
 State Historic Preservation Office
 Sustainability

References

Further reading
 "The economic benefits of preserving community character: a practical methodology".  Joni Liethe, National Trust for Historic Preservation (1991).

External links
 Official website, National Park Service
 Official website
 Preserve America Grants Effectiveness (Advisory Council on Historic Preservation)
 The Economics of Historic Preservation (Randall Mason, Brookings Institution)
 The Economics of Historic Preservation: A Community Leader's Guide (Donovan Rypkema, National Trust for Historic Preservation)
 The Economic Benefits of State Historic Preservation Investment Tax Credits
 Measuring the Economic Impact of Federal Historic Properties
 The Preservation Economic Impact Model (National Park Service).
 PlaceEconomics evaluation of Save America's Treasures vs. Economic Stimulus Plan

Hillary Clinton
Laura Bush
Michelle Obama
Historic preservation in the United States
Conservation and restoration of cultural heritage
Cultural heritage of the United States
Establishments by United States executive order
Heritage registers in the United States
United States Department of the Interior
United States federal boards, commissions, and committees